In Your Hands is a 2010 French drama film directed by Lola Doillon. The film premiered at the 2010 BFI London Film Festival.

Cast 
 Kristin Scott Thomas as Anna Cooper
 Pio Marmaï as Yann
 Jean-Philippe Écoffey as Policier déposition
  as Caroline 
  as Concierge
  as Milène
  as Michel

References

External links 

2010 drama films
2010 films
French drama films
2010s French films